Richard Lin (born 6 July 1991 at United States) is a Taiwanese American violinist. He won competitions in Poland, United States, Singapore, Japan, and Taiwan. In 2013 he won the first prize in the Sendai International Music Competition. In 2015 he was the third prize laureate in 9th Joseph Joachim International Violin Competition Hannover. In 2016 he was the fifth prize laureate in 15th Henryk Wieniawski Violin Competition. In 2018 he won First Prize in 10th International Violin Competition of Indianapolis.

Life and career
Born in the United States and raised in Taichung, Taiwan, Richard Lin began his violin studies at the age of 4. In his native Taiwan, he studied with Gregory Lee. Since 2008 he has studied at the Curtis Institute of Music, under professor Aaron Rosand. Since 2013 he has studied at Juilliard School, under professors Lewis Kaplan. In 2011 he took the second place in 6th Michael Hill International Violin Competition in New Zealand. In 2013 he won the first prize in 5th Sendai International Music Competition. In 2015 he was the second prize laureate in Singapore International Violin Competition, and the third prize laureate in 9th Joseph Joachim International Violin Competition Hannover. He has appeared as a soloist with Sendai Philharmonic Orchestra, Auckland Philharmonic Orchestra, Oklahoma City Philharmonic, National Symphony Orchestra (Taiwan), National Taiwan Symphony Orchestra, Taipei Symphony Orchestra, Royal Chamber Orchestra of Wallonia, Yokohama Sinfonietta, Macau String Association Orchestra, and Academy of Taiwan Strings. He has also given many solo recitals in Japan, Taiwan, and the United States. He currently resides in New York City.

Awards
 2011: Second Prize in 6th Michael Hill International Violin Competition in New Zealand
 2013: First Prize and Audience Prize in 5th Sendai International Music Competition
 2015: Second Prize, Goh Soon Tioe Violin and Piano Recital Prize and Audience Prize in Singapore International Violin Competition
 2015: Third Prize and JJV Community Award in 9th International Joseph Joachim Violin Competition
 2016: Fifth Prize in Shanghai Isaac Stern International Violin Competition
 2016: Fifth Prize in 15th Henryk Wieniawski Violin Competition
 2018: First Prize in 10th International Violin Competition of Indianapolis

Recordings
 Beethoven, Bartok, Brahms – Richard Lin and Sendai Philharmonic Orchestra (FONTEC: FOCD-9612)
 Brahms: Violin Sonatas (FONTEC: FOCD-9653)

See also
 List of Taiwanese Americans

References

External links
Richard Lin | The Violin Channel

Living people
1991 births
American people of Taiwanese descent
Musicians from Taichung
Taiwanese violinists
Curtis Institute of Music alumni
Juilliard School alumni
21st-century violinists